Bill Spencer (born March 23, 1956) is an American cross-country skier. He competed in the men's 15 kilometre classical event at the 1988 Winter Olympics.

References

External links
 

1956 births
Living people
American male cross-country skiers
Olympic cross-country skiers of the United States
Cross-country skiers at the 1988 Winter Olympics
Sportspeople from Anchorage, Alaska